Mičakovce is a village and municipality in Svidník District, Prešov Region, Slovakia.

History
The village was first mentioned in historical records in 1390.

Geography
Mičakovce lies at an altitude of 180 metres and covers an area of 4.7 km². It has a population of about 122 people.

References

External links
 
http://www.statistics.sk/mosmis/eng/run.html

Villages and municipalities in Svidník District
Šariš